Los Dueños del Estilo (English: The Owner's of Style) was the first album of the duo Karel & Voltio. The album languished, however, and the duo's enthusiasm dwindled.

Track listing
 Dale Con La Lenta
 Yal 
 Siempre Hay Algo (feat. Yaga & Mackie)
 Julio Voltio (Voltio solo)
 Vas A Sentir 
 Socio Dale Casco (Remix) (Voltio solo)
 Mete y Saca (feat. Plan B)
 Perrear Contigo 
 Me Pones Mal 
 Socio Dale Casco (Voltio solo)
 Mis Ojos
 ¿Dónde Están?
 Bonus Track: The Score

Julio Voltio albums
2003 albums